Pale horse(s) may refer to:

Books
 Pale horse (Bible), in the Book of Revelation, a horse ridden by Death, one of the Four Horsemen of the Apocalypse
 The Pale Horse, a 1961 novel by Agatha Christie
 The Pale Horseman, a 2005 novel by Bernard Cornwell
 On a Pale Horse, a 1983 novel by Piers Anthony
 Pale Horse, Pale Rider, a 1939 collection of three short novels by Katherine Anne Porter
 Pale Horse, a 1995 play by Joe Penhall
 Pale Horse, a fictional band in Alan Moore's comic Watchmen

Film and TV
 The Pale Horse, a 1997 film of Christie's novel with Colin Buchanan and Hermione Norris
 The Pale Horse (TV series) a 2020 serial drama based on Christie's novel
 A pale horse is frequently seen and mentioned throughout the three seasons of Twin Peaks

Music
 Pale Horse and Rider, a musical duo
 Pale Horses (album), a 2015 album by MewithoutYou 
 "Pale Horse", a song by John Vanderslice from the album Cellar Door
 "Pale Horses", a song by Moby
 "Pale Horse", a song by The Smashing Pumpkins from Oceania

Other
 VMM-561 or Pale Horse, a squadron of the United States Marine Corps

See also 
 A Pale Horse Named Death, an American metal band
 Behold a Pale Horse (disambiguation)
 Pale Horse - A Parkway Drive melody